Glow & Behold is the second album by Yuck. It is the band's first album without former lead singer and guitarist Daniel Blumberg.

Reception

The album received mixed reviews. Most reviewers saw the loss of the band's former frontman as pivotal, describing the band's new sound as smooth but lacking in passion. Mischa Pearlman of NME commented, "...this shift in direction sparkles with style and heart. Largely, though, the verve that made their debut exciting is, unfortunately, AWOL." There were positive comments about some tracks, such as "Middle Sea" and "Lose My Breath", which Ian Cohen of Pitchfork claimed, "boast the same kind of fuzzed-up leads that made the guitars of  “Georgia” or “Get Away” as easy to sing along with as the vocals," but had "little of their frazzled energy", and accused singer Max Bloom and producer Chris Coady of trying to, "smooth out songs that lacked edge to begin with". Tim Sendra of Allmusic finished his review by saying, "All this record does is break the heart of anyone who fell in love with Yuck because of [their debut] album, and that's a real shame."

Track listing
"Sunrise in Maple Shade"
"Out of Time"
"Lose My Breath"
"Memorial Fields"
"Middle Sea"
"Rebirth"
"Somewhere"
"Nothing New"
"How Does It Feel"
"Twilight in Maple Shade (Chinese Cymbals)"
"Glow & Behold"

References

2013 albums
Fat Possum Records albums
Yuck (band) albums
Albums produced by Chris Coady